Alagoz (also Romanized as Ālāgoz; also known as Ālāgan  and ‘Alāvīz) is a village in Khvor Khvoreh Rural District, in the Central District of Bijar County, Kurdistan Province, Iran. At the 2006 census, its population was 15, in 4 families. The village is populated by Kurds.

References 

Towns and villages in Bijar County
Kurdish settlements in Kurdistan Province